Frederick Hutton may refer to:
 Frederick Hutton (Royal Navy officer) (1801–1866), British naval officer
 Frederick Hutton (scientist) (1836–1905), English scientist active in New Zealand
 Frederick Remsen Hutton (1853–1918), American mechanical engineer

See also
 Hutton (disambiguation)
 Frederick (disambiguation)